Lək (also, Lak) is a village and municipality in the Barda Rayon of Azerbaijan.  It has a population of 1,055.

References 

Populated places in Barda District